A Terrible Tragedy is a 1916 American silent comedy film featuring Oliver Hardy.

Cast
 Jerold T. Hevener as Emile Scribbler
 Oliver Hardy as Markoff (as Babe Hardy)
 Billy Bowers as Professor Foddletop
 Nellie Farron as Zola

See also
 List of American films of 1916
 Oliver Hardy filmography

External links

1916 films
American silent short films
1916 short films
American black-and-white films
1916 comedy films
Silent American comedy films
American comedy short films
1910s American films